Goma is a city in the Democratic Republic of Congo.

Goma or GOMA may also refer to:

Places

Democratic Republic of Congo
 University of Goma, a public university
 Roman Catholic Diocese of Goma, a diocese in the Ecclesiastical province of Bukavu
 Goma International Airport, an airport serving Goma
 Goma (commune), a commune of the city of Goma in North Kivu, Democratic Republic of the Congo

Elsewhere
 Guma, Pishan County, also spelled as Goma, a town in Xinjiang, China

 Goma Station, a railway station in Nantan, Kyoto Prefecture, Japan

People
 Goma (people), an ethnic group in Kigoma region

Surname
 Alain Goma (born 1972), French footballer
 Guy Goma (born 1969), accidental TV pundit
 Isidro Goma y Tomas (1869–1940), Spanish Roman Catholic Cardinal
 Louis Sylvain Goma (born 1941), Congolese politician
 Michel Goma (born 1932), French fashion designer
 Paul Goma (born 1935), Romanian writer
 Yadvinder Goma (born 1986), Indian politician

Given name
 Goma Lambu (born 1984), DR-Congo-born English footballer

Characters
 Goma (character), a character in the Legend of Zelda game series

Galleries
 Gallery of Modern Art, Glasgow, Scotland
 Gallery of Modern Art, Brisbane, Australia

Other uses
 Homa (ritual), an ancient Buddhist fire ritual
 Goma (software), finite element application
 Goma (Mexico City Metrobús), a BRT station in Mexico City

See also
 Goma-2, a high explosive
 Gomer, in the Hebrew Bible
 Kingdom of Gomma, Ethiopia
 Gomma (woreda), Ethiopia
 Oliver N'Goma (1959–2010), Gabonese singer
 Ngoma (disambiguation)
 Gomashio, sesame seeds and salt used as a seasoning
 Algoma (placename), a placename given to many different places throughout the US and Canada

Ethnic groups articles needing merge action
Kongo-language surnames
Surnames of Congolese origin